Acacia burrowsiana, also known as Burrows’ snakewood or gizzard wattle, is a tree belonging to the genus Acacia and the subgenus Juliflorae that is endemic to western Australia.

Description
It often has a gnarled habit with the trunk and main branches looking contorted and with a horizontally spreading crown. Like most Acacias it has phyllodes rather than true leaves. The pale green and erect phyllodes have a narrowly linear oblanceolate or linear elliptic shape and can be straight to shallowly incurved. The phyllodes tend to be sub-rigid, coarsely pungent, glabrous and have parallel nerves. The brown to black coloured seeds within have an elliptic to widely elliptic shape.

Distribution
It has a discontinuous distribution throughout an area of the Mid West region of Western Australia roughly centred around Wiluna where it is found on flats along creeks and river beds, breakaways and crests of low rises growing in loamy soils with ironstone gravel and stones or calcrete soils with laterite and quartz. Most of the population is found in the Murchison region around Mount Magnet, near Sandstone and Cue.

See also
 List of Acacia species

References

burrowsiana
Acacias of Western Australia
Plants described in 2007
Taxa named by Bruce Maslin